The Greek Wikipedia (also Hellenic Wikipedia, Elliniki Vikipedia) is the Greek-language edition of Wikipedia, the free online encyclopedia. It was started on December 1, 2002. It surpassed the 10,000 article mark on May 16, 2006, the 100,000 article mark on April 9, 2014, and the 200,000 article mark on November 27, 2021.

Greek Wikipedia is the main free internet encyclopedia written in Greek. Its main competitor, Livepedia, started on 2004, and had more than 100,000 articles. Many articles of Livepedia were republished articles from donations of various publishing houses and the site was also a wiki. Approximately 250 articles are coming at least partially from Livepedia, thanks to the Livepedia's use of GFDL until November 1, 2008. As of 2018, Greek Wikipedia's pageviews surpassed the 250 million mark annually. The daily pageviews of Greek Wikipedia vary within the year; peaking in the winter period (late November to mid March), while the months with the least pageviews are usually June, July and August. The active users are  today (as of). The highest and lowest active users' numbers are recorded in the same period.

The Greek Wikipedia's community has organized some meetups as well. Since 2011, the Wikimedia User Group Greece has aided in the organization of various promotional activities, as well as some article contests.

Statistics

 is -largest by number of articles
 has  administrators
 has  registered users, of whom  were active
 has  edits

As of May 2019, Greek Wikipedia is usually visited by 5,500,000 to 6,500,000 unique devices per month, while the unique devices per day are approximately 440,000.

The origin of pageviews is mainly from Greece. The remainder of the pageviews comes from Cyprus, Germany, United States, United Kingdom and other countries. As of May 2019, Greece is the source for the bulk of the pageviews, being the source for nearly 27,000,000 pageviews out of 32,500,000 on the same month.

As of May 2019, Greek Wikipedia receives approximately 30,000,000 pageviews per month, with a peak at winter months. Together with an increasing number of articles and improvements on quality, the pageviews have improved substantially in the last three years.

Since 2017, the annual article growth amounts to 15,000 articles annually, while the average monthly growth amounts to 1,020-1,300 articles per month. In 2021 a new record of new articles has been reached, as more than 17,000 articles have been created since the beginning of the year, while the previous record was with 16,510 in 2017. Users with at least one edit during 2021 are expected to surpass 8,500, while in 2020 it was 8,012 and 7,453 in 2019.

History

Early years 
Greek Wikipedia was created on 1 December 2002. At the first months of existence, the new articles were very small and a handful of users were contributing, some of them just adding interwikis to other Wikipedias. The first Wikiproject were launched in November 2005.

Article count 
The Greek Wikipedia was created on 4 December 2002. On 16 May 2006 it reached 10,000 articles. On 10 October 2006 it reached 15,000 articles, while on 17 March 2007 it reached 20,000 articles. On this period there were 30 new articles being created every day, while there were 50 active users. In December of that year the Greek Wikipedia reached 30,000 articles, while on 14 February 2009 it reached 40,000 articles. Fourteen months later, on 10 April 2010, it reached 50,000 articles; eleven months later, on 8 March 2011 it reached 60,000 articles. In February 2012 it had 70,000 articles, while 252 days later it reached 80,000 articles.

In July 2013, it reached 90,000 articles, while 271 days later it reached 100,000 articles, while 195 days later it reached 110,000 articles. On 11 July 2016, after 629 days, it reached 120,000 articles, due to the general recount of late March 2015 which removed several thousand redirects from the mainspace. As a result, the article count fell to 105,500 articles, while before the recount the article count was 119,500 articles. Greek Wikipedia is maintaining a pace of growth of around 15,000 articles per year. This trends are generally stable since 2017, when previously Greek Wikipedia had usually 10,000 to 12,000 articles.

Users and editors

Logos

In the press 
In the press, Wikipedia has been referred as a good source of information; however, periodically it has been criticised for having a non-neutral point of view in politics-related articles. Also, Greek Wikipedia has received extensive coverage from the Greek-language press for some of its actions, such as the anniversary of 10 years since its opening. In addition to, full articles of Greek Wikipedia or parts of them are often included in news articles and other websites in the Greek language.

Notes

Further reading

Press
 Εύη Γκολώνη (Evi Goloni), Wikipedia. Η διαδικτυακή εγκυκλοπαίδεια ενηλικιώνεται (Wikipedia. The Internet encyclopedia becomes an adult), Popular Science, τ. (volume) 44, page 23, May 2006).
 Ανδρονίκη Κολοβού (Androniki Kolovu), "Wikipedia" Η ελεύθερη διαδικτυακή εγκυκλοπαίδεια για τους λάτρεις της γνώσης (Wikipedia, the free Internet encyclopedia for knowledge lovers), τεύχος (volume) "Η ζωή μας" (our life), ΠΡΩΤΟ ΘΕΜΑ (Proto Thema), 2 July 2006.
 Ηλίας Μαγκλίνη (Ilias Maglini), Η παγκόσμια κοινότητα της Wikipedia, Ελληνικά: πλούτος και σκουπίδια (The global community of Wikipedia, Hellenic: wealth and trash), Η Καθημερινή (I Kathimerini), ένθετο (submagazine) Τέχνες και Γράμματα (Arts and letters), 20 August 2006).
 Εύη Ελευθεριάδου (Evi Eleftheriadu), Οι Έλληνες της Βικιπαίδειας (The Hellenes of Wikipedia), ένθετο (submagazine) "Ορίζοντες" (Horizons), Τα Νέα, 13 December 2006.

External links

 Greek Wikipedia mobile version 
 Statistics for Greek Wikipedia (Deprecated) by Erik Zachte
 Wikimedia Statistics - Greek Wikipedia 
 Tell us about Greek Wikipedia
 Wikimedia User Group Greece official website (in Greek)

Other Wikipedias in Hellenic languages 
 Pontic Wikipedia
 Ancient Greek Wikipedia (test-wiki, Wikimedia Incubator) 

Greek encyclopedias
Greek-language websites
Internet properties established in 2002
Wikipedias by language